Trenton Central High School West is a four-year comprehensive public high school that serves students in ninth through twelfth grades from Trenton, in Mercer County, New Jersey, United States, operating as part of the Trenton Public Schools.

As of the 2015-16 school year, the school had an enrollment of 679 students and 64.1 classroom teachers (on an FTE basis), for a student–teacher ratio of 10.6:1. There were 524 students (77.2% of enrollment) eligible for free lunch and 45 (6.6% of students) eligible for reduced-cost lunch. The school has a chronic absence rate of 48.0% as of the 2015-16 schoolyear.

Awards, recognition and rankings
The school was the 302nd-ranked public high school in New Jersey out of 339 schools statewide in New Jersey Monthly magazine's September 2014 cover story on the state's "Top Public High Schools", using a new ranking methodology.

Administration
The principal is Mark Hoppe.

The superintendent of the Trenton Public School District and the school is Dr. Fredrick McDowell.

References

External links
Trenton Central High School West
Trenton Public Schools

School Data for the Trenton Public Schools, National Center for Education Statistics

High schools in Trenton, New Jersey
Public high schools in Mercer County, New Jersey